This is a list of notable people who were either born in, lived for a significant period of time in, or are otherwise closely associated with Albuquerque, New Mexico. The “Blue Sky” capital had 559,374 citizens as of (2019). They are referred to by the demonym "Albuquerquean", and by the colloquial "burqueño" or "burqueña".

Academia and science

Acting and filmmaking

Art and architecture

Aviation and spaceflight

Business

Government, politics, and law

Journalism and broadcasting

Military

Music

Individuals

Groups

Sports

Baseball

Basketball

Combat sports

Football

Motorsports

Soccer

Other sports

Writing

Miscellaneous

References

External links

Albuquerque
Albu